CSA  CAN3-Z299 is a series of quality assurance standards developed by the Canadian Standards Association in the 1970s.  It is an alternative to the ISO 9000 series of standards.
The stated objectives of the Z299 series of standards are:

(a)	“To provide customers with assurance that products or services of the required quality will be supplied;
(b)	For suppliers to assume responsibility for achieving the required quality and then demonstrating that it has been provided.”

CSA CAN3-Z299 Series
CAN3-Z299 includes the following standards.  Z299.4, .3, .2, .1 apply increasingly rigorous quality assurance activities.  They were most recently reaffirmed in 2006.

CAN3-Z299.0-86:  Guide for Selecting and Implementing the CAN3-Z299-85 Quality Assurance Program Standards
The Guide provides the intent of the standards, compares the four quality assurance standards available in the series, and provides guidance on selecting the appropriate standard for the product or service.

CAN3-Z299.4-85: Quality Assurance Program – Category 4
Z299.4 is appropriate for mass-produced products designed to ordinary technical standards, or high volume services.  It includes requirements to:
Carry out inspection and testing
Have a plan to deal with non-conforming items
Keep records
Control measurement and testing equipment

CAN3-Z299.3-85: Quality Assurance Program – Category 3
Z299.3 is appropriate for products or services which involve some complex processes.  Failure of the product could cause significant monetary cost or some risk to health and safety.  It includes all of Z299.4 requirements, plus:
Control of procurement activities
Control of documentation
Traceability of items
Control packaging & shipping
A manual to document these activities

CAN3-Z299.2-85: Quality Assurance Program – Category 2
Z299.2 is for products or services requiring complex processes and technology, requiring planning in production and verification of design.  Failure of the product could cause high monetary cost or significant risk to health and safety.  It includes all of Z299.4 and Z299.3, plus:
Control of manufacturing activities
Control of handling and storage
A plan to deal with multiple inspections and tests
Corrective action program to prevent repetition of errors
Procedures to describe these activities

CAN3-Z299.1-85: Quality Assurance Program – Category 1
Z299.1 is suitable for custom designed products or services with a high degree of technology.  Failure in service could result in extremely high monetary loss or high risk to health and safety.  It includes all of Z299.4, Z299.3, and Z299.2, plus:
Control of design activities through procedures
Independent audits on the quality assurance program

Quality Assurance Principles of Z299
Z299 covers twenty-one areas of the product or service lifecycle:

1.	Tender and Contract Review
2.	Design
3.	Documentation
4.	Measuring and Test Equipment
5.	Procurement
6.	Inspection and Test Plans
7.	Incoming Inspection
8.	In-Process Inspection
9.	Final Inspection
10.	Inspection Status
11.	Identification and Traceability
12.	Handling and Storage
13.	Production
14.	Special Processes
15.	Packaging and Shipping
16.	Quality Records
17.	Nonconformance
18.	Corrective Action
19.	Customer Supplied Products and Services
20.	Statistical Techniques
21.	Quality Audits

Comparison to ISO 9000
ISO 9000 and Z299 standards have many similar requirements.  One of the main differences between them is that Z299 requires Inspection and Test Plans to be submitted to the purchaser by the vendor, and independent inspection and testing.  The Inspection and Test Plan details key inspections and tests at certain points in the production process, and is meant to complement a generic quality program by providing detail on the requirements of a specific product.

See also
 ISO 9000 Quality management systems
 Quality management system

References

External links

ISO (International Organization for Standardization)
CSA(CSA)

Standards
Quality assurance